Hopea plagata is a species of flowering plant in the family Dipterocarpaceae. It is found in Borneo and the Philippines. The tree grows to 55m tall.

References

plagata
Trees of Borneo
Trees of the Philippines
Flora of Mindanao
Critically endangered flora of Asia
Taxonomy articles created by Polbot
Taxa named by Francisco Manuel Blanco